Dhūl-Nūn Abū l-Fayḍ Thawbān b. Ibrāhīm al-Miṣrī (d. Giza, in 245/859 or 248/862), often referred to as Dhūl-Nūn al-Miṣrī or Zūl-Nūn al-Miṣrī for short, was an early Egyptian Muslim mystic and ascetic. His surname "al Misri" means "The Egyptian". He was born in Upper Egypt in 796, Dhul-Nun is said to have made some study of the scholastic disciplines of alchemy, medicine, and Greek philosophy in his early life, before coming under the mentorship of the mystic Saʿdūn of Cairo, who is described in traditional accounts of Dhul-Nun's life as both "his teacher and spiritual director." Celebrated for his legendary wisdom both in his own life and by later Islamic thinkers, Dhul-Nun has been venerated in traditional Sunni Islam as one of the greatest saints of the early era of Sufism.

Name
It has been speculated by scholars whether "Dhul-Nun" was an honorific (laqab) for the mystic rather than his name proper, which is sometimes believed to be Thawbān. As "Dhul-Nun," literally meaning "the one of the fish [or whale]," is another name for the Hebrew prophet Jonah in Islamic tradition, it is sometimes believed that this title was given to Dhul-Nun in commemoration of Jonah.

Life
Dhul-Nun is one of the most prominent saints of early Islamic tradition, appearing "in the earliest accounts of Ṣūfism as the leading figure of his generation." Often depicted as the spiritual master of Sahl al-Tustari (c. 818–896), the traditional hagiographies relate that the latter refused to engage in mystical discourse until after Dhul-Nun's death, on account of his recognition of Dhul-Nun's elevated rank in wisdom and gnosis.

Dhul-Nun al-Misri is considered among the most prominent saints of early Sufism and holds a position in the Sufi chronicles as high as Junayd Baghdadi (d. 910) and Bayazid Bastami (d. 874). He studied under various teachers and travelled extensively in Arabia and Syria. The Muslim scholar and Sufi Sahl al-Tustari was one of Dhul-Nun al-Misri's students. In 829 he was arrested on a charge of heresy and sent to prison in Baghdad, but after examination he was released on the caliph's orders to return to Cairo, where he died in 859; his tombstone has been preserved.

Dhul-Nun's name came about in relation to an incident on a sea voyage. He was falsely accused of stealing a
jewel from a merchant. He cried out "O Creator, Thou knowest best", whereupon a large number of fish raised their heads above the waves, each bearing a jewel in its mouth.

A legendary alchemist and thaumaturge, he is supposed to have known the secret of the Egyptian hieroglyphs. His sayings and poems, which are extremely dense and rich in mystical imagery, emphasize knowledge or gnosis (marifah) more than fear (makhafah) or love (mahabbah), the other two major paths of spiritual realization in Sufism. None of his written works have survived, but a vast collection of poems, sayings, and aphorisms attributed to him continues to live on in oral tradition.

Osho mentions him as "an Egyptian Sufi mystic, one of the greatest who has ever walked on the earth".

Contemporary Sufi Llewellyn Vaughan-Lee mentions an incident from the life of Dhul-nun in his work Catching the Thread 

A story from the life of the ninth-century Sufi, Dhu-l-Nun, the Egyptian, illustrates this: 
I was wandering in the mountains when I observed a party of afflicted folk gathered together.
“What befell you?” I asked.
“There is a devotee living in a cell here,” they
answered. “Once every year he comes out and
breathes on these people and they are all
healed. Then he returns to his cell, and does not
emerge again until the following year.”
I waited patiently until he came out. I beheld
a man pale of cheek, wasted and with sunken
eyes. The awe of him caused me to tremble. He
looked on the multitude with compassion. Then
he raised his eyes to heaven, and breathed
several times over the afflicted ones. All were
healed.
As he was about to retire to his cell, I seized
his skirt. “For the love of God,” I cried. “You
have healed the outward sickness; pray heal the
inward sickness.”
“Dhu-l-Nun,” he said, gazing at me, “take
your hand off me. The Friend is watching from
the zenith of might and majesty. If He sees you
clutching at another than He, He will abandon
you to that person, and that person to you, and
you will perish each at the other’s hand.”
So saying, he withdrew into his cell.

Notes

External links
 Sufi Teachings of Dhu'l-Nun al-Misri at archive.org. 

9th-century Egyptian people
9th-century historians from the Abbasid Caliphate
Medieval Egyptian historians
Egyptian Sufi saints
Egyptian religious leaders
Alchemists of the medieval Islamic world
9th-century deaths